The A1144 is a minor A road in Lowestoft, Suffolk, England. It links the A1117 to central Lowestoft and the A12.

References

Roads in Suffolk